The fourth series of The Only Way Is Essex, a British semi-reality television programme, began airing on 29 January 2012 on ITV2. The series concluded on 29 February 2012 and consisted of ten episodes. This is the first series to include Bobby Cole Norris, Charlie King, Chris "Little Chris" Drake, Georgina Dorsett, James "Diags" Bennewith, Ricky Rayment and Tom Kilbey. It is the last series to include twins Dino and Georgio Georgiades, and Peri Sinclair who had appeared since the third series, and Nicola Goodger who first appeared during the second series. The series heavily focuses on new boy Ricky causing a stir in Essex by going behind the boy's backs and trying to get with many of the girls, as well as the strain between friendships when Billi finds love with Cara's brother Tom, and Jess finally cuts Lauren G out of her life. It also features the aftermath of Arg and Lydia's break-up, and Lucy and Mario hitting another rough patch in their turbulent relationship.

Cast

Episodes

{| class="wikitable plainrowheaders" style="width:100%; background:white;"
|-style="color:black"
! style="background:#FACC2E;"| SeriesNo.
! style="background:#FACC2E;"| SeasonNo.
! style="background:#FACC2E;"| Title
! style="background:#FACC2E;"| Original airdate
! style="background:#FACC2E;"| Duration
! style="background:#FACC2E;"| UK viewers

|}

Reception

Ratings

References

The Only Way Is Essex
2012 in British television
2012 British television seasons